The 2019 Nigerian Senate election were held in all 109 senatorial districts where voters elected senators using first-past-the-post voting. Most elections were held on February 23, 2019 with some elections running into February 24 while others had supplementary or rerun elections that took place at a later date. The last regular senatorial elections for all districts were in 2015.

The All Progressives Congress solidified its majority after nearly losing it to defections in 2018. The APC gained a net total of 8 seats compared to the pre-elections situation. The Peoples Democratic Party lost a net total of 4 seats compared to the pre-elections situation, notably with Senate President Bukola Saraki losing in his district of Kwara Central. Minor parties dwindled from 6 seats pre-election to a single seat, with the Young Progressives Party's Ifeanyi Ubah winning Anambra South.

Upon the opening of the 9th Nigeria National Assembly, Ahmad Lawan (APC-Yobe North) was elected as President of the Senate while Ovie Omo-Agege (APC-Delta Central) and Yahaya Abubakar Abdullahi (APC-Kebbi North) became Deputy Senate President and Senate Majority Leader, respectively. Enyinnaya Abaribe (PDP-Abia South) became the Senate Minority Leader.

Results summary and analysis 
As the APC strengthened its hold on the Red Chamber, 44 seats flipped from one party to another with two dozen lawmakers losing re-election. Notable flips included all three seats in Kwara State where Senate President and APC-turned-PDP Kwara Central Senator Bukola Saraki lost his first election amidst the Ó Tó Gẹ́ Movement against the Saraki dynasty and the state PDP. In more perceived rebukes of political godfatherism and party switching, PDP-turned-APC former Senate Minority Leader and Akwa Ibom North-West Senator Godswill Akpabio lost while all three Kano PDP candidates lost after outgoing Kano Central Senator Rabiu Kwankwaso defected from the APC to the PDP. Other major stories were the losses of other prominent senators: Binta Masi Garba (APC-Adamawa North), Victor Umeh (APGA-Anambra Central), Emmanuel Nnamdi Uba (APC-Anambra South), Isah Misau (PDP-Bauchi Central), Barnabas Andyar Gemade (SDP-Benue North-East), George Akume (APC-Benue North-West), Suleiman Othman Hunkuyi (PDP-Kaduna North), and Shehu Sani (PRP-Kaduna Central).

As is common after Nigerian elections, a swarm of ligation followed the senatorial races with court and tribunal decisions changing results in the districts of Ekiti South, Niger East, and Sokoto South along with one ruling changing all three Zamfara elections and a rerun election being called in Kogi West. The Akwa Ibom North-West election was also annulled, albeit only in certain polling units, and a 2020 supplementary election held which confirmed Akpabio's loss. Prior to the elections, all Rivers State APC nominees were disqualified barring two incumbent senators running for reelection from contesting.

Abia State

Adamawa State

Akwa Ibom State

Anambra State

Bauchi State

Bayelsa State

Benue State

Borno State

Cross River State

Delta State

Ebonyi State

Edo State

Ekiti State

Enugu State

Federal Capital Territory

Gombe State

Imo State

Jigawa State

Kaduna State

Kano State

Katsina State

Kebbi State

Kogi State

Kwara State

Lagos State

Nasarawa State

Niger State

Ogun State

Ondo State

Osun State

Oyo State

Plateau State

Rivers State

Sokoto State

Taraba State

Yobe State

Zamfara State

Notes

References 

Senate
 
2019 in Nigeria